Gabès, also spelled Cabès, Cabes, Kabes, Gabbs and Gaps, is the capital city of the Gabès Governorate in Tunisia. It is located on the coast of the Gulf of Gabès. With a population of 152,921, Gabès is the 6th largest Tunisian city. Gabes is 327 km away from Tunis and 113 km away from Sfax.

History

Etymology
Takapes, the ancient name of Gabès, is a Numidian (Berber) toponym. Later, the prefix "Ta" (meaning "to" in Berber) was dropped, and the place became known as Kapes. As in Arabic the sound /p/ is unknown, Kapes became known as Kabes, and later known as Gabès.

Roman period 
Gabès is the ancient Tacapae or Tacape (Τακάπη in Ancient greek)  or Tacapes of the Roman province of Tripolitania.

Strabo refers to this city as an important entrepot of the Lesser Syrtis. Pliny (18.22) remarks that the waters of a copious fountain at Tacape were divided among the cultivators according to a system where each had the use of the water during a certain interval of time.

The Tabula Peutingeriana shows Tacape between Macomades and Sabratha.

Bishopric 
Tacapae became a Christian bishopric that, no longer being a residential see, is included in the Catholic Church's list of titular sees.

Three of its bishops are known:
Dulcitius, legate of the bishops of Tripolitana to the Council of Carthage (403) and present at the Conference of Carthage (411); 
Servilius, exiled by Huneric in 484; 
Caius or Gallus, legate of the bishops of his province to the Council of Carthage (525).

After the Roman and Christian period 

7th century: The Umayyad Caliphate conquest. Muhammed's companion Sidi Abu Lubaba Al'Ansari settles in Gabès.
1574: Gabès becomes part of the Eyalet of Tunis after the Ottoman conquest.
1881: Gabès comes under a French protectorate.
1940: Following the Fall of France, Gabès comes under German control.
1941: Gabès pogrom
1943: Gabès returns to French control with the help of the British (in the Mareth Line). The operation results in serious damage to the city infrastructure. 
1945: The rebuilding of Gabès starts.
1956: Gabès reverts to Tunisian control with the independence of Tunisia from the French.

Education 
 University of Gabès (science university, engineering school...)

Economy 
Gabès is one of the biggest industrial cities in Tunisia. Most industries are chemical oriented, this is why the city offers one of the best chemistry degrees in Africa from the University of Gabès. The main industries are:
 Cement
 Chemical products
 Brick Factories
 Oil refinery

The fast-growing numbers of factories has resulted in fairly serious pollution of the area and of the Gulf of Gabès.  In recent years the government is working on new programs and laws to decrease the amount of pollution.

Transport 

Gabès – Matmata International Airport is in the city.

Gabès will soon be upgraded with one light rail system under the number 7 that will run from the railway station to the port of Gabès. Featuring rolling stock made by Alstom, Gabès will receive 15 new train sets.

Railways
Gabès is terminus of a narrow gauge  branch railway from the capital, and is the nearest railway station to the Libyan border at Ras Ajdir.
Gabès has also one of the biggest ports in Tunisia; it is used usually to ship the mineral products from the city of Gafsa.

Roads
Gabès will be linked soon with the national motorway A1 (Tunis – Ras Ajdir).

Climate 
Gabès has a hot arid climate (Köppen climate classification BWh), bordering upon a hot semi-arid climate (BSh), characterised by hot summers and pleasant winters. Rainfall is low throughout the year and negligible during the hot summer.

Tourism

Overview
Gabès is famous for its traditional Souqs in Jarah; it is known also for its attractive beach and the unusual seaside oasis (Gabès is located on the coast of the Mediterranean). The best parts of the beach are in the south of the city (Road to Djerba). The best one is the Lemawa or Lemaya beach. The government is planning to build a tourist zone there in the coming years.
Gabès has a unique feature in the world, in this city you find the mountain, the sea, the oasis and the desert. The streets of Gabès come alive at night during Ramadan, where sooks (shops) are open on the streets and parties happen almost every day in the night during Ramadan.
The most visited place in Gabès is the town Matmata.

Place to visit: 
 The traditional souks
 The Kornich
 Mosque of Sidi Boulbaba
 The Mouradi school
 Zaouia Sidi Ahmed Toujani

Gallery

World Heritage Status
This site was added to the UNESCO World Heritage Tentative List on May 28, 2008, in the Cultural category.

Notable people
Gladys Adda, activist, was born here in 1921
Juliette Bessis, Tunisian historian, was born here (1925–2017)
Silvan Shalom, Israeli politician, former minister and Knesset member
Tahar Haddad, writer, feminist advocator, activist, reformer (1899–1935)
Mohamed Ali El Hammi, one of the founding fathers of Tunisian syndicalism, an activist (1890–1928)

See also

Gabès Governorate, one of the twenty-four governorates (provinces) of Tunisia
Gulf of Gabès
University of Gabès, a public university

References

Notes

External links

Gabès official website
"Gabès: Oasis on the Sea" from Lexicorient 

Cities in Tunisia
Oases of Tunisia
Communes of Tunisia
Mediterranean port cities and towns in Tunisia
Tacapae
Populated places in Gabès Governorate
World Heritage Tentative List